Rasmussen is a surname of Danish and Norwegian origin. It may also refer to:

Geography 

 Rasmussen, Queensland, a suburb in the City of Townsville, Queensland, Australia
 Rasmussen Basin, a natural waterway through the Canadian Arctic Archipelago in the territory of Nunavut
 Rasmussen Lowlands, a 3,000 km² coastal plain complex of wetlands in Nunavut, Canada
 Knud Rasmussen Glacier in the far northwest of Greenland, to the north of the Thule Air Base

Other uses 

Murder of Sherri Rasmussen

 Rasmussen's aneurysm, a pulmonary artery aneurysm adjacent or within a tuberculous cavity
 Rasmussen College, a private college offering degrees at multiple campuses in Minnesota
 Rasmussen's encephalitis, a rare, progressive neurological disorder
 Rasmussen Reports, an American public opinion polling company
 The "Rasmussen Report'''", an informal name for the WASH-1400 report about nuclear reactor safety
 Knud Rasmussen-class patrol vessel, a class of offshore patrol vessel operating in the Royal Danish Navy from 2008

See also
 Kall-Rasmussen Fragment, a parchment page (ca. 1275) from Saxo Gesta Danorum''
 The Journals of Knud Rasmussen, a Canadian-Danish film about the pressures on the traditional Inuit culture when explorer Knud Rasmussen introduces European cultural influences